Luisa Gavasa Moragón (born 8 April 1951) is a Spanish actress. She has appeared in more than fifty films since 1977.

Selected filmography

References

External links 

1951 births
Living people
Spanish film actresses
20th-century Spanish actresses
21st-century Spanish actresses
Spanish television actresses